Fakhereh Saba, (1920–2007) was the first female opera singer in Iran. Saba was the daughter of a cousin of the Iranian musician Abolhasan Saba. She started her primary and musical education in Iran and continued her higher education in France. She went to France in April 1947 and was accepted as one of the 20 students at the Conservatoire de Paris. Fakhereh Saba had a lot of notable students including Mansoureh Ghasri, Mohhamad Nouri and many others. Saba and her husband, Alireza Afzalipour, were founders of Shahid Bahonar University of Kerman and Kerman University of Medical Sciences.

See also 
 Music of Iran

References

1920 births
2007 deaths
Iranian opera singers
Iranian philanthropists
20th-century women opera singers
20th-century philanthropists